Future Party is the name of a number of unrelated political parties including:
Future Party (Australia), a political party in Australia from 2013 to 2016, now named Science Party
Egypt's Future Party, a political party in Egypt
Japan Future Party, a political party in Japan
Future Party (Sweden), a political party in Sweden
Future Party (Turkey), a political party in Turkey
Future Movement, a political party in Lebanon
Party for the Future, a political party in the Netherlands
Party of the Future, a political party in Netherlands

See also 
New Future Coalition Party, a political party in Norway
Party for European Future, a political party in the Republic of Macedonia
Yesh Atid (There is a Future), a political party in Israel
United Future, a political party in New Zealand
Bareunmirae Party (Righteous Future Party), a former political party in South Korea
Our Future, a political party in Korea